Protein tyrosine phosphatase type IVA 3 is an enzyme that in humans is encoded by the PTP4A3 gene.

The protein encoded by this gene belongs to a small class of prenylated protein tyrosine phosphatases (PTPs). PTPs are cell signaling molecules that play regulatory roles in a variety of cellular processes. This class of PTPs contain a PTP domain and a characteristic C-terminal prenylation motif. Studies of this class of PTPs in mice demonstrated that they were prenylated proteins in vivo, which suggested their association with cell plasma membrane. Overexpression of this gene in mammalian cells was reported to inhibit angiotensin-II induced cell calcium mobilization and promote cell growth. Two alternatively spliced variants exist.

References

Further reading